Duke Wartislaw X of Pomerania (1435 – 17 December 1478) was the second son of Duke Wartislaw IX of Pomerania and his wife, Sophia of Saxe-Lauenburg.

Wartislaw married twice.  On 5 March 1454, he married Elizabeth of Brandenburg, the widow of the Duke Joachim II "the Younger" of Pomerania-Stettin and daughter of Margrave John of the Neumark.  She died in early 1465. They had two sons: Swantibor V and Ertmar, both died of the plague in 1464 at an early age.

Wartislaw's second wife was Magdalena of Mecklenburg, the daughter of Henry, Duke of Mecklenburg-Stargard.  This marriage was childless.  After Wartislaw's death, Magdalena married Count Burkhard of Barby-Mühlingen.

In 1458, Wartislaw's father died and he and his older brother, Eric II began jointly ruling Pomerania.  They quickly got into a dispute over the inheritance and succession of Pomerania-Stolp and Pomerania-Rügenwalde.  Eric had married princess Sophia, the daughter of Duke Bogislaw IX and after the death in 1459 of Eric of Pomerania, the last duke of Further Pomerania, wanted to rule Further Pomerania alone.  Wartislaw wanted to rule Further Pomerania jointly, while Elector Frederick II of Brandenburg claimed Further Pomerania on behalf of his ward, the minor Otto III of Pomerania-Stettin.

In 1464, Otto III died of the plague.  With his death, the Pomerania-Stettin line of the House of Griffins died out.  Frederick II then claimed that Pomerania-Stettin was a completed fief of Brandenburg, and that it should fall back to Brandenburg, while Eric II and Wartislaw held that Pomerania-Stettin should fall to the surviving line of the House of Griffins. This led to a conflict known as the Stettin War of Succession.  Wartislaw X showed himself as an implacable opponent of the Hohenzollerns.  His first wife, Elisabeth, who was herself a Hohenzollern, left him and this was used as ammunition by the Hohenzollerns in their propaganda war against the Pomeranian dukes.  Due to Wartislaw's intransigence, a compromise with the Hohenzollerns was only possible after his death.  In 1479, his nephew Bogislaw X, Duke of Pomerania, negotiated the Peace of Prenzlau.  This treaty confirmed an agreement from 1472, that Wartislaw had approved.  The key points were that the Dukes in Wolgast were allowed to keep Pomerania-Stettin, but had to accept that they were vassals of Brandenburg and held Pomerania as a fief.  Wartislaw' opposition had been directed mainly against this last provision.  After Wartislaw's death, Bogislaw X reunited all part of Pomerania and ruled the Duchy for almost fifty years.  In the end, he also successfully challenged the status of Pomerania as a fief of Brandenburg.  The issue was finally settled by Bogislaw's sons George I and Barnim XI in the Treaty of Grimnitz of 1529.

Wartislaw died in 1478 and was buried in the monastery at Neuenkamp, which later evolved into the city of Franzburg.

Ancestors

References and sources

External links 
 genealogie-mittelalter.de

Dukes of Pomerania
Pomeranian nobility
1435 births
1478 deaths
15th-century German people
People associated with the University of Greifswald